The first government of Isabel Díaz Ayuso was formed on 20 August 2019, following the latter's election as President of the Community of Madrid by the Assembly of Madrid on 14 August and her swearing-in on 19 August, as a result of the People's Party (PP) and Citizens (Cs) being able to muster a majority of seats in the Assembly with external support from Vox following the 2019 Madrilenian regional election.

Until 2021, the cabinet comprised members of the PP and Cs, as well as a number of independents proposed by both parties, to become the first coalition government to be formed in the region. On 10 March 2021, regional president Ayuso expelled all Cs members from the cabinet after the regional branch of the party in the Region of Murcia had pledged to bring down the PP government there through a motion of no confidence with the Spanish Socialist Workers' Party (PSOE). It was automatically dismissed on 5 May 2021 as a consequence of the 2021 regional election, but remained in acting capacity until the next government was sworn in.

Investiture

Cabinet changes
Ayuso's first government saw a number of cabinet changes during its tenure:

 On 2 October 2020, Alberto Reyero announced his resignation as Minister of Social Policy, Family, Equality and Natality, in a "meditated" decision, which was largely to his frequent clashes with the Health minister, Enrique Ruiz Escudero, and the regional president Díaz Ayuso (both PP members) over their management of long-term care facilities during the COVID-19 pandemic in the Community of Madrid.
 On 10 March 2021, Ayuso expelled all six Cs members from her cabinet and announced a snap regional election for 4 May, citing "concerns" over an alleged veiled attempt to bring her down through a joint motion of no confidence of Cs with the Spanish Socialist Workers' Party (PSOE), which the former denied.

Council of Government
The Council of Government is structured into the offices for the president, the vice president and 13 ministries.

Notes

References

2019 establishments in the Community of Madrid
Cabinets established in 2019
Cabinets of the Community of Madrid